Chae Chang is a tambon (subdistrict) of San Kamphaeng District, in Chiang Mai Province, Thailand. In 2005 it had a population of 7,585 people. The tambon contains nine villages.

References

Tambon of Chiang Mai province
Populated places in Chiang Mai province